Charlie Michael Patino (born 17 October 2003) is an English footballer who plays as a midfielder for EFL Championship club Blackpool, on loan from  club Arsenal.

Early life
Born in Watford, Patino started his career at St Albans City, before joining Luton Town at the age of seven. At 11 years old he signed for Arsenal in 2015 for a £10,000 fee.

Club career
Patino rose quickly through the ranks at Arsenal, featuring for the under-18 side at the age of only 14. He is seen as one of Arsenal's most promising youth prospects, with head of scouting at Arsenal, Sean O’Connor, describing him as the "best player who has ever walked through the doors at Hale End", and Arsenal scout Brian Stapleton calling him "the best kid I've ever seen."

He signed his first professional contract with Arsenal in October 2020. In the same month, he was included in The Guardian'''s "Next Generation" 2020 list, as one of the best young players emerging from Premier League clubs' academies. On 21 December, Patino made his senior debut for Arsenal in a 5–1 EFL Cup quarter-final victory against Sunderland, scoring the final goal of the game at the end of the second-half, shortly after replacing fellow academy graduate Emile Smith Rowe. On 9 January 2022, Patino was a starter in a 1-0 FA Cup Third Round loss to Nottingham Forest. 

On 3 August 2022, Patino signed on loan for Blackpool for the duration of the 2022–23 season.

International career
Patino has represented England at under-15, under-16 and under-17 level. He remains eligible for Spain through his father holding a Spanish passport, and the Spanish FA have reportedly made attempts to get him to switch allegiance.

On 9 October 2021, Patino made his debut for the England U19s during a 3–1 victory against Mexico in Marbella.

On 21 September 2022, Patino made his England U20 debut as a substitute during a 3-0 victory over Chile at the Pinatar Arena.

Style of play
A ball-playing midfielder, Patino has stated that former Arsenal players Santi Cazorla and Cesc Fàbregas are influences in his style of play. Through his youth career, he was dubbed 'the next Frenkie De Jong' by fans, as his playstyle was seen as 'eerily close' to the former-Ajax midfielder. 

Media
Patino was involved in the Amazon Original sports docuseries All or Nothing: Arsenal'', which documented the club by spending time with the coaching staff and players behind the scenes both on and off the field throughout their 2021–22 season. 

Patino also appeared on Season 1 of the docuseries Inside Hale End, which documented Arsenal's academy set-up & gave an exclusive view into the Hale End campus, featuring interviews with players & coaching staff.

Career statistics

Club

References

2003 births
Living people
Sportspeople from Watford
English footballers
England youth international footballers
English people of Spanish descent
Association football midfielders
St Albans City F.C. players
Luton Town F.C. players
Arsenal F.C. players
Blackpool F.C. players
English Football League players